The flag of the Kingdom of Saudi Arabia is the flag used by the government of Saudi Arabia since 15 March 1973. It is a green flag featuring in white an Arabic inscription and a sword. The inscription is the Islamic creed, or shahada: "There is no deity but God; Muhammad is the Messenger of God".

Design
The Arabic inscription on the flag, written in the calligraphic Thuluth script, is the shahada or Islamic declaration of faith:

 
 
"There is no deity but God; Muhammad is the Messenger of God."
The green of the flag represents Islam and the sword stands for the strictness in applying justice.

The flag is manufactured with identical obverse and reverse sides, to ensure the shahada reads correctly, from right to left, from either side.  The sword also points to the left on both sides, in the direction of the script. The flag is sinister hoisted, meaning that when viewed from the obverse (front) side, it is hoisted to the left of the flagpole.

The usual color of the flag's green was approximated by Album des pavillons as Pantone 330 C, while the color used on flags at United Nations is approximately Pantone 349. At the 2012 London Olympics, Pantone 355 was used.

Construction Sheet

Use

Because the shahada is considered holy, the flag is not normally used on T-shirts or other items. Saudi Arabia protested against its inclusion on a planned football to be issued by FIFA, bearing all the flags of the participants of the 2002 FIFA World Cup. Saudi officials said that kicking the creed with the foot was completely unacceptable. Similarly, an attempt by the U.S. military to win favour with children of the Khost Province of Afghanistan by distributing footballs adorned with flags, including that of Saudi Arabia, ended in demonstrations.

The flag is never lowered to half-mast as a sign of mourning, because lowering it would be considered blasphemous. Similarly, the flags of Afghanistan, Iraq and self-declared Somaliland are also never at half-mast.

The normal flag cannot be hoisted vertically according to Saudi legislation. Special vertical flags are manufactured where both the inscription (the creed) and the emblem (the sword) are rotated, although this is rare, as most Arab countries traditionally do not hoist flags vertically.

History
The precursor states to Saudi Arabia were Nejd and Hejaz. The state flag of Nejd followed today's Saudi flag pattern very closely. The state of Hejaz followed the patterns seen in countries like Palestine and Sudan. Caliphates such as the Rashiduns, the Umayyads and the Abbasids used other flags with only one color. After the Sack of Baghdad in 1258 by the Mongols, the primary caliphate became the Mamluk Sultanate. In 1517, the Ottomans invaded Egypt and inherited Hejaz and ruled it until the Great Arab Revolt of 1916. From 1902 until 1921 a different Arabic inscription was used. One of the primary opponents to the Saudis was the Emirate of Jabal Shammar of the Al Rashid family in the north of the peninsula, until their defeat in 1921.

 
The Al Saud, the ruling family of Saudi Arabia, has long been closely related with Muhammad ibn Abd al-Wahhab. He and the people who followed him, since the 18th century, had used the shahada on their flags. In 1921, Abdulaziz Abdulrahman Al-Saud, leader of the Al Saud and the future founder of the Kingdom of Saudi Arabia, added a sword to this flag. The design of the flag was not standardized prior to March 15, 1973, and variants with two swords and/or a white vertical stripe at the hoist were frequently used. By 1938, the flag had basically assumed its present form, except the sword had a different design (with a more curved blade) and it, along with the shahada above, took up more of the flag's space.

Royal Standard
The Royal Standard consists of a green flag, with an Arabic inscription and a sword featured in white, and with the national emblem embroidered in gold in the lower right canton of the year 1973.

The script on the flag is written in the Thuluth script. It is the shahada or Islamic declaration of faith:

 
 
There is no deity but God; Muhammad is the Messenger of God

Other flags
The civil ensign, for use by merchant vessels at sea, is a green flag with the state flag in the canton with a white border. The royal standard is the state flag with the palm tree and swords in the canton.

See also 

 List of Saudi Arabian flags
 Emblem of Saudi Arabia
 Saudi Flag Day

References 

11. https://saudiflag.sa/en

External links

 World Flags Information, Saudi Arabian page
 Saudi Arabian flag and associated information

Saudi Arabia
Saudi Arabia
National symbols of Saudi Arabia
Saudi Arabia
Saudi Arabia